Figure skating at the 2024 Winter Youth Olympics will take place at the Gangneung Ice Arena in Gangneung, Gangwon Province, South Korea in January 2024.

Unique to the Youth Olympic Games is a mixed NOC team trophy competition.

Eligibility
Skaters are eligible to participate at the 2024 Winter Youth Olympics if they were born between 1 January 2006 and 31 December 2009.

Qualification system
The overall quota for the figure skating competition is 72 total skaters, consisting of 36 men and 36 women. There will be 18 skaters in each of the single skating disciplines (men's and women's), 6 pair skating teams, and 12 ice dance teams. 

If a country placed a skater in the first or second position (or third in ice dance) in a 2023 World Junior Figure Skating Championships discipline they qualify for two spots in that discipline at the Youth Olympics. All other nations can enter one athlete until a quota spot of fourteen for each singles event, four for pairs and nine for ice dance, are reached. There are further four spots for each single event, two spots for pairs and three spots for ice dance at the 2023–24 ISU Junior Grand Prix. Only one quota place per discipline and NOC can be earned through the 2023–24 ISU Junior Grand Prix series, and only if a NOC doesn't already have a quota place for that discipline.

Number of entries per discipline 
Based on the results of the 2023 Junior Worlds and the 2023–24 Junior Grand Prix the following countries have earned YOG quota places.

Notes  
1. As the host, South Korea has the right to one entry per discipline if not qualified through the 2023 Junior Worlds or the 2023–24 Junior Grand Prix.

References

2024 in figure skating
International figure skating competitions hosted by South Korea
2024
2024 Winter Youth Olympics